The corporal (arch. corporax, from Latin corpus "body") is a square white linen cloth, now usually somewhat smaller than the breadth of the altar, upon which the chalice and paten, and also the ciborium containing the smaller hosts for the Communion of the laity, are placed during the celebration of the Catholic Eucharist (Mass).

History
It may be assumed that something in the nature of a corporal has been in use since the earliest days of Christianity. Naturally it is difficult, based on the extant records from the early church, to distinguish the corporal from the altar-cloth. For instance, a passage of St. Optatus (c. 375), where he asks, "What Christian is unaware that in celebrating the Sacred Mysteries the wood [of the altar] is covered with a linen cloth?" (ipsa ligna linteamine cooperiri)  leaves us in doubt to which he is referring. This is probably the earliest direct testimony; for the statement of the Liber Pontificalis, "He (Pope Sylvester I) decreed that the Sacrifice should not be celebrated upon a silken or dyed cloth, but only on linen, sprung from the earth, as the Body of our Lord Jesus Christ was buried in a clean linen shroud" cannot be relied upon. Still, the ideas expressed in this passage are found in an authentic letter of St. Isidore of Pelusium, in the liturgical writings of St. Sophronius of Jerusalem (corporale sindonem qua sepultus est), and again in the "Expositio" of St. Germanus of Paris in the sixth century. Indeed they lasted through the Middle Ages.

It is quite probable that in the early centuries only one linen cloth was used which served both for altar-cloth and corporal. This would have been of large size and doubled-back to cover the chalice. Much doubt must be felt as to the original use of certain cloths of figured linen in the treasury of Monza which Barbier de Montault sought to identify as corporals. The corporal was described as palla corporalis, or velamen dominic mens, or opertorium dominici corporis, etc.; and it seems generally to have been of linen, though we hear of altar-cloths of silk, or of purple; (a coloured miniature in the tenth-century Benedictional of St. Thelwold also seems to show a purple altar-covering), or of cloth-of-gold. In some of these cases it seems difficult to decide whether altar-cloth or corporal is meant.

However, there is no doubt that a clear distinction had established itself in Carolingian times or even earlier. Thus, in the tenth century, Regino of Perm  quotes a council of Reims as having decreed "that the corporal [corporale] upon which the Holy Sacrifice was offered must be of the finest and purest linen without admixture of any other fibre, because Our Saviour's Body was wrapped not in silk, but in clean linen". He adds that the corporal was never to remain on the altar, but was to be put in the Missal (Sacramentorum libro) or shut up with the chalice and paten in some clean receptacle. And when it was washed, it was to be washed first of all by a priest, deacon, or subdeacon in the church itself, in a place or a vessel specially reserved for this, because it had been impregnated with the Body and Blood of Our Lord. Afterwards it might be sent to the laundry and treated like other linen. The suggestion as to keeping the corporal between the leaves of the Missal is interesting because it shows that it cannot, even in the tenth century, have always been of that extravagant size which might be inferred from the description in the "Second Roman Ordo" (cap. ix), where the deacon and an assistant deacon are represented as folding it up between them. Still it was big enough at this period to allow its being bent back to cover the chalice, and thus serve the purpose of our present pall. This is traditionally done by the Carthusians, who use no pall and have no elevation of the chalice.

As regards the size of the corporal, some change may have taken place when it ceased to be usual for the people to bring loaves to the altar, for there was no longer need of a large cloth to fold back over them and cover them. At any rate, it is in the eleventh and twelfth centuries that the practice of doubling the corporal over the chalice gave way to a new plan of using a second (folded) corporal to cover the mouth of the chalice when required. The question is debated in some detail in one of the letters of St. Anselm, who quite approves of the arrangement; and a hundred years later we find Pope Innocent III stating, "there are two kinds of palls or corporals, as they are called [duplex est palla qu dicitur corporale] one which the deacon spreads out upon the altar, the other which he places folded upon the mouth of the chalice."

The essential unity of the pall and the corporal is further shown by the fact that the special blessing which both palls and corporals must always receive before use designates the two as linteamen ad tegendum involvendumque Corpus et Sanguinem D.N.J.C.; i.e., "to cover and enfold the Body and Blood of our Lord Jesus Christ". This special blessing for corporals and palls is alluded to even in the Celtic liturgical documents of the seventh century, and the actual form traditionally prescribed by the Roman Pontifical is found almost in the same words in the Spanish Liber Ordinum of about the same early date.

According to traditional liturgical rules, the corporal must not be ornamented with embroidery, and must be made entirely of pure white linen, though there seem to have been many medieval exceptions to this rule. It is not to be left to lie open upon the altar, but when not in use is to be folded and put away in a burse, or corporas-case, as it was commonly called in pre-Reformation England. Upon these burses much ornamentation is lavished, and this has been the case since medieval times, as many existing examples survive to show. The corporal is now usually folded twice in length and twice in breadth, so that when folded it still forms a small square. At an earlier period, when it was larger and was used to cover the chalice as well, it was commonly folded four times in length and thrice in breadth. This practice continued to be followed by some of the older religious orders, even when the rest of the church changed. The corporal and pall have to pass through a triple washing at the hands of a priest, or at least a subdeacon, before they may be sent to a laundry. Also, when they are in use they may not be handled by any but the clergy, or sacristans to whom special permission is given.

See also
Antimension
Thabilitho
Chapel of the Corporal at Orvieto Cathedral
Shroud of Turin, the original shroud possibly providing inspiration for the nomenclature of corporal

References 
 Citations

Bibliography
Atchley in St. Paul's Eccles. Soc. Transactions (1900), IV, 156-160
Barbier de Montault in Bulletin Monumental (1882). 583-630.
Barbier de Montault, Le Mobilier Ecclésiastique
Gihr, The Mass, tr. (Freiburg, 1902), 281-264
Charles Rohault de Fleury, "La Messe" (Paris, 1888), VI, 197-204; Dict. Christ. Antiq., s.v. Corporal;
Streber in Kirchenlexikon, III, 11O5-11O7
Thalhofer, Liturgik, I, 777-781
Van der Stappen, Sacra Liturgia (Mechlin, 1902), III, 102-110

Eucharistic objects